Gordon Dean Peters (born 1963) is a retired United States Navy vice admiral who last served as the commander of the Naval Air Systems Command from May 31, 2018 to September 9, 2021. He previously served as the Program Executive Officer for Air Anti-Submarine Warfare, Assault, and Special Mission Programs of the United States Navy. Peters graduated from the United States Naval Academy in 1985 and was designated a naval aviator in 1986. He earned a Master of Science degree in aeronautical engineering from the Naval Postgraduate School in 1992. Peters also holds a post-graduate degree in telecommunications and has graduated from the Naval Test Pilot School.

References

1963 births
Living people
Place of birth missing (living people)
United States Naval Academy alumni
United States Naval Aviators
United States Naval Test Pilot School alumni
Naval Postgraduate School alumni
United States Navy admirals